Léopard was a  74-gun ship of the line of the French Navy.

Career 
On 30 October 1788, Léopard departed Toulon for a cruise in the Caribbean, under Captain de la Galissoninère.

On 15 September 1790, a fight between sailors from Léopard and  caused a mutiny; the entire crew of Léopard was expelled from the Navy by a decree of the National Constituent Assembly.

From 1792, Léopard took part in the Expédition de Sardaigne under Captain Bourdon-Gramont, capturing Carloforte on 8 January 1793. On 17 February, Léopard ran aground in a storm off Cagliari; after two days trying to refloat her, the crew abandoned the ship and set her on fire after offloading the guns and matériel.

See also
 List of ships of the line of France

References

Ships of the line of the French Navy
Téméraire-class ships of the line
1787 ships
Ships built in France
Shipwrecks in the Mediterranean Sea